The 1993 World Men's Handball Championship was the 13th handball World Championship. It was held in Sweden 10–20 March. Russia won the championship.

Qualification

Teams

*Note: Although the Czech Republic and Slovakia became separate countries in 1993, the countries still competed together in the tournament as the Czechoslovak Handball Federation was not split yet.

Preliminary round
Top 3 from groups A & B plays in group 1 while top 3 from groups C & D plays in group 2 in the main round. The teams carry their results against the other teams to the main round. The last team from each group is eliminated from the championship.

Group A

Group B

Group C

Group D

Ranking round

Main round
The winners of each group face of against each other in the final. The second-place finishers play the game for 3rd position, the third-place finishers play the game for 5th position and so on.

Group 1

Group 2

Placement round

11th place match

9th place match

7th place match

5th place match

Bronze final

Final

Final standings

Medal summary

Top goalscorers

Top goalkeepers

External links
 IHF Men's World Championships
 Men Handball World Championship 1993
 Dataesport
 The Official Website of the Beijing 2008 Olympic Games – Medallists from previous World Championships

World Handball Championship tournaments
World Mens Handball Championship, 1993
H
H
March 1993 sports events in Europe
International sports competitions in Stockholm
International sports competitions in Gothenburg
Sports competitions in Halmstad
Sports competitions in Uddevalla
1990s in Stockholm
1990s in Gothenburg